Oceanian youth bests are ratified by the Oceania Athletics Association (OAA) and  comprise the all-time best marks set in competition by Oceanian athletes aged 17 or younger throughout the entire calendar year of the performance. OAA does not maintain official indoor bests. All indoor bests shown on this list are tracked by statisticians not officially sanctioned by the governing body.

Outdoor

Key:

h = hand timing

Mx = Mixed gender race

Boys

Girls

Mixed

Indoor

Boys

Girls

Notes

References
General
Oceania Records 5 December 2022 updated
Specific

Youth
Oceanian